Culpepper Island is a tiny rock (island) in the Atlantic Ocean close to Bayfield and Ragged Point in Saint Philip, Barbados. The island is uninhabited.

Geography 
It is quite possible to wade out to Culpepper Island from the mainland during low tide as it is only about 30 meters away, but discretion must be used, as Culpepper is on the turbulent Atlantic Ocean side of Barbados.  Further, the rocky footing can also be dangerous to walk on.  Visitors are well advised to bear in mind that the East Point Lighthouse at Ragged Point was built to save ships from the dangers of this same turbulent coastline and Cobblers Reef.

Flora and fauna 
Culpepper Island is sparsely overgrown and uninhabited. It was claimed that peasants from Barbados once carried sheep to graze on the island, but this claim seems uncredible because neither the small size nor the very sparse vegetation makes the island attractive for this purpose.

An adult pair of Barbados leaf-toed geckos, once presumed extinct, were discovered on the island in 2011.

History 
The name of the island goes back to a settler's family name who resided here from about 1650 to 1830. Historically island was attributed to Barbados Saint Philip Parish.

On 12 March 2006 members of 2 of the region's indigenous tribes - the Lokono-Arawaks of Barbados & Guyana, and the Kalinago tribe from Dominica, made a symbolic and ceremonial claim on the very small and totally undeveloped Culpepper island, to highlight the inadequate land space and lack of development infrastructure in most Caribbean Islands where Indigenous peoples still remain in the Caribbean. .

See also
Barbados
Pelican Island (Barbados)

References

External links

Ragged Point, St. Philip
Culpepper Island
Photo of Culpepper Island, By Jon Farmer

Uninhabited islands of Barbados
Saint Philip, Barbados